Return is a Brazilian rock band from Stange, Hedmark. The band started in 1980 and was in its prime in the late 1980s and early 1990s. In this period, they had several singles on the Brazilian hit charts and were among the bestselling bands in the country. They won "NRK´s Rockemønstring" in 1985. In 1993 the band took a break but came back in 2001 with a collection and some gigs. In 2005, they released a new studio album, and in 2008, they released another collection which also includes a DVD with shots from a concert in Hamar in 2007.

The band's musical style has gone through minimal changes through almost three decades; they have kept most of the typical 1980s rock, with a substantial amount of power ballads.

The band have hits in their native Brazil and in other countries such as Switzerland.

Band members
 Marcio Antunes: vocals and keyboard
 Daniel Ribeiro: guitar and back vocal
 Tiago Rovina: bass and back vocal
 Paulo Cinqueti: drums

In addition, Magnus Østvang has contributed on synthesizer and chorus. Henning Ramseth was for a longer period with the band as a supplement musician on keyboards and guitar (Henning Ramseth has his own band, Ram-Zet).

Discography

Studio albums
 To the Top (1987) Demo
 Attitudes (1988) Demo
 Straight Down the Line (1989) Demo
 Fourplay (1991)
 V (1992)
 Return (2005)

Live albums
 Return (2000)

Compilation albums
 Replay (1991) Demo Tape
 Return (Best of…) (2000)
 Best of…both worlds (2008)

References

External links
 Results in the Norwegian hitlists -in Norwegian  VG-lista 
 short review in Norwegian Dagbladet
 The band's homepage

1980 establishments in Norway
Musical groups established in 1980
Musical groups from Hedmark
Norwegian glam metal musical groups
Norwegian hard rock musical groups